was a Japanese artist in the ukiyo-e style. He was active in Edo from the Bunka period onward. His Osaka period dated from 1822 to 1825. In Edo, he resided in Honjo Yanagawa-chō district. He was first the pupil, then son-in-law, and finally adopted son of the Edo master painter Katsushika Hokusai. He designed illustrated books, prints, and surimono. In Osaka, he worked with the gifted block cutter and printer Tani Seikō.

Shigenobu focused on theatrical subjects, but some of his best work in Osaka includes a series of deluxe ōban prints depicting geisha in the Shinmachi Nerimono parade in Osaka, and approximately 30 fine surimono on various subjects (at least 18 in collaboration with the Tsuru-ren Crane Group of kyōka poets), with blocks cut and printed by Seikō.

His pupils included Utagawa Kuninao; Shigeharu; Yanagawa Nobusada (Yokinobu); Shigemasa; Shigemitsu.

External links
Yanagawa Shigenobu I by Honolulu Museum of Art

See also
Erotic art
Shunga
Ukiyo-e

External links

1787 births
1832 deaths
Ukiyo-e artists
Shunga by artist